Harry Newman (born 19 February 2000) is an English professional rugby league footballer who plays as a  or er for the Leeds Rhinos in the Super League and the England Knights at international level. 

He has spent time on Dual registration from Leeds at Featherstone Rovers in the Betfred Championship.

Background
Newman was born in Huddersfield, West Yorkshire, England.

Career
In 2017 he made his Super League début for Leeds against the Wigan Warriors.

In 2020, Newman was named the Super League Young Player of the Year.

In 2022, he made seven appearances for the Rhinos, scoring 4 tries.

Newman missed out on Leeds' 2020 Challenge Cup victory to Salford Red Devils and the 2022 Grand Final defeat to St Helens due to injury.

International career
In 2019 he was selected for the England Knights against Jamaica at Headingley Rugby Stadium. He was given an England call-up by Shaun Wane in early 2020 but has never played for the senior team.

References

External links

Leeds Rhinos profile
SL profile

2000 births
Living people
England Knights national rugby league team players
English rugby league players
Featherstone Rovers players
Leeds Rhinos players
Rugby league players from Huddersfield
Rugby league wingers